Elijah Allan Morgan (born May 13, 1996) is an American professional baseball pitcher for the Cleveland Guardians of Major League Baseball (MLB). He played college baseball for the Gonzaga Bulldogs. Morgan was selected by the Indians in the eighth round of the 2017 MLB draft, and made his MLB debut in 2021.

Early and personal life
Morgan was born in Rancho Palos Verdes, California, to Diana and Dave Morgan (a former deputy sports editor for the Los Angeles Times), and is Jewish. He has a sister, named Briana. He resides in Redondo Beach, California.

High school
Morgan attended Peninsula High School in Rolling Hills Estates, California. In 2014, as a senior, he had a 10–2 win–loss record with a 1.23 earned run average (ERA). He was named Bay League Co-Pitcher of the Year and All-California Interscholastic Federation First Team. He was not drafted out of high school in the 2014 Major League Baseball draft. In the summer of 2014, he was 8–0 and an All Star for the Yakima Valley Pippins in the collegiate West Coast League.

College
Morgan enrolled at Gonzaga University, where he played college baseball for the Gonzaga Bulldogs after being offered a spot on the team as a walk-on. In 2015, as a freshman, Morgan pitched to a 1–0 record with a 2.36 ERA (10th in the West Coast Conference; WCC) in 14 appearances (three starts), had a 1.118 WHIP (9th), gave up 1.6 walks/9 innings pitched (4th), and had 4.5 strikeouts/walk (4th). Pitching for the Mat-Su Miners in the collegiate  Alaska Baseball League in the summer of 2015, he was 5–0 with an 0.73 ERA, and was named to the All-League Team. In 2020, he was named to the Miners' All-Decade Team.

As a sophomore in 2016, Morgan transitioned into a full-time starter, going 10–3 (his 10 wins were 2nd in the Conference) with a 3.73 ERA and 107 strikeouts (4th), and leading the Conference with 3 shutouts in 111 innings over 16 starts, earning him a spot on the All-WCC First Team. After the season, he played in the collegiate  Cape Cod League for the Orleans Firebirds.

In 2017, his junior season, Morgan compiled a 10–2 record (his 10 wins were again 2nd in the Conference) with a 2.86 ERA in 14 starts, during which he had 2 shutouts (tied for the Conference lead), struck out a Conference-leading 138 batters (2nd-most in school history, and 3rd in the nation) in  innings (12.3 strikeouts/9 innings), had a 1.103 WHIP (10th), had 4.45 strikeouts/walk (8th), and was once again named to the All-WCC First Team. He was one of four pitchers in the country with multiple 15-strikeout games.  He was also named Perfect Game/Rawlings First Team All-American, Collegiate Baseball Second Team All-American, three-time National Player of the Week, and five-time Rawlings WCC Pitcher of the Week.

Professional career

Draft and minor leagues

2017–19
Morgan was selected by the Cleveland Indians in the eighth round of the 2017 Major League Baseball draft. He signed with the Indians for a $135,000 signing bonus. He made his professional debut that season with the Mahoning Valley Scrappers of the Class A Short Season New York–Penn League, pitching to a 3–2 record with a 1.03 ERA (3rd-lowest in the league) in 35 innings in which he struck out 58 batters (14.9 strikeouts per 9 innings) and had a 0.94 WHIP. He was recognized by Baseball America for having the best changeup in Cleveland's farm system.

Morgan began 2018 with the Lake County Captains of the Class A Midwest League, and was promoted to the Lynchburg Hillcats of the Class A-Advanced Carolina League in May. In 27 starts between the two clubs, Morgan went 9–7 with a 3.27 ERA, striking out 156 batters in  innings (9.8 strikeouts per 9 innings). For the second straight season, he was recognized by Baseball America for having the best changeup in Cleveland's farm system, and he was also named an MiLB.com Organization All Star and the Indians' 2018 Minor League Pitcher of the Year.

In 2019, he began the year with Lynchburg before being promoted to the Akron RubberDucks of the Class AA Eastern League in May, with whom Morgan was named a mid-season All-Star. In July, he made one spot start with the Columbus Clippers of the Class AAA International League before being reassigned to Akron, with whom he finished the year. Over 26 games (25 starts) between the three clubs, Morgan went 9–6 with a 3.39 ERA, striking out 146 over  innings (9.3 strikeouts per 9 innings). He led the Indians' minor leaguers in innings, was second in strikeouts, and was named an MiLB.com and MLB.com Organization All Star.

2020–21
Morgan did not play a minor league game in 2020 due to the cancellation of the minor league season, caused by the COVID-19 pandemic, and instead spent the season at the team's Lake County Alternate Training Site. He was once again recognized by Baseball America as having the best changeup and control among Indians minor league pitchers. Through 2020, he averaged 10.2 strikeouts and 2.3 walks per 9 innings in the minor leagues. The Indians added him to their 40-man roster on November 20, 2020.

To begin the 2021 season, Morgan returned to Columbus, now members of the newly-formed Triple-A East, with whom he pitched in five games. Baseball America ranked him as having the best command in Cleveland's system.

Major leagues

2021
Morgan was called up to the majors by the Indians on May 28, 2021, and made his major league debut that same day, starting against the Toronto Blue Jays. With winds gusting up to 45 mph in a game called early due to weather, over  innings he gave up six earned runs, eight hits (including three doubles), and two walks, and struck out one, and was tagged with the loss as the Indians fell 11–2. Indians manager Terry Francona said: "I don't know how you evaluate that outing. I thought he was going to get blown off the mound.... That was some of the worst conditions I think I've ever seen."

Morgan had a lower ERA each successive month of the season, culminating with his five starts in the last month of the season in which he was 3–1 with a 3.90 ERA and held batters to a .240 batting average. For the 2021 Indians, Morgan started 18 games in which he went 5–7 with a 5.34 ERA and 81 strikeouts over  innings.

2022
Pitching for the Cleveland Guardians in 2022, Morgan was 5-3 with 10 holds and a 3.38 ERA, as in 50 games (one start) he pitched 66.2 innings. He gave up 46 hits (holding hitters to a .192 batting average) and 13 walks for an 0.885 WHIP, struck out 72 batters, and had a strikeout-to-walk ratio of 6.09. Among American League relievers who pitched 60 or more innings, he had the highest first-strike percentage (70.9%), gave up the second-fewest walks per 9 innings (1.55), had the third-highest strikeout-to-walk ratio, and had the fourth-lowest WHIP.

In the post-season, Morgan pitched in the 2022 American League Wild Card Series, where in 1.1 innings he struck out two batters and did not allow any baserunners.

International career 
Morgan committed to play for Team Israel in the 2023 World Baseball Classic in Miami, Florida, starting March 11–15. He will be playing for Team Israel manager and former All Star Ian Kinsler, and alongside All Star outfielder Joc Pederson, Gold Glove outfielder Harrison Bader, pitcher Dean Kremer, and others.

Pitching style
Morgan has a low-90s four-seam fastball that touches 94 mph and averages 3.3 inches of horizontal movement (which is 48% better than average), an above-average "Bugs Bunny" four-seam changeup, and a slider (one soft version of it in the 82 mph range, and another version of it in the 87–88 mph range). His changeup had an average velocity of 75.1 mph, the slowest among major league pitchers who worked at least 40 innings in 2021. In 2022 he threw his fastball half the time and batters hit .205 against it, his changeup a quarter of the time (.184), and his slider 16% of the time (.182). He is known for his command.

See also
 List of Jewish baseball players

References

External links

Gonzaga Bulldogs bio

1996 births
Living people
Akron RubberDucks players
Baseball players from California
Cleveland Guardians players
Cleveland Indians players
Columbus Clippers players
Gonzaga Bulldogs baseball players
Jewish American baseball players
Jewish Major League Baseball players
Lake County Captains players
Lynchburg Hillcats players
Mahoning Valley Scrappers players
Major League Baseball pitchers
Orleans Firebirds players
People from Rancho Palos Verdes, California
Sportspeople from Redondo Beach, California
Sportspeople from Los Angeles County, California
Mat-Su Miners players